A Dean Metalman Z is a bass guitar made by Dean Guitars in the shape of the Dean Z.

There are two versions of this bass, both only produced currently in black. The first has one humbucking pickup in the bridge position, 1 volume control, and a tone control. The second, the Metalman Z 2A, has red buzzsaw inlays on the neck, two humbucking pickups, a bridge and a neck, two volume controls, and a 2 band active EQ with controls for high and low frequencies.

Notable Users
Brix Milner (Dope)
Dusty Hill (ZZ Top)
Axel Rotten (Slaughter House Mafia)
Gabriel Leonard (Quarterjack)

See also
Dean Metalman ML

References

Dean bass guitars